Neil Hood (born 30 June 1950), is a former Scottish footballer who played as a striker.

Hood started his career with Ayr United, before moving to Queen of the South in Dumfries.

Hood scored 52 goals for Hamilton Academical between 1972 and 1975 before he moved to Clyde.

Hood scored 80 goals in 171 games in his first spell at the Bully Wee, which included a Second Division Championship win the club's centenary year. Hood then joined Stranraer as manager for season 1980–81 season. This proved to be unsuccessful and he rejoined Clyde as a player in 1981, helping them to win another Second Division title, but he never received a medal back then. He was eventually presented with one 26 years later by the club in May 2008 Hood played 187 games with the club in two spells, scoring 83 goals. Hood was voted as Clyde's all-time cult hero in a Football Focus poll in 2004.

Honours 

 Clyde

 Scottish Second Division: 1977–78, 1981–82

 Individual

 QOSFC Supporters' Player of the Year: 1971–72
Clyde FC Hall of Fame: Inducted, 2012

Notes

References

Living people
1950 births
Scottish footballers
Ayr United F.C. players
Queen of the South F.C. players
Clyde F.C. players
Hamilton Academical F.C. players
Stranraer F.C. players
Scottish Football League players
Scottish football managers
Stranraer F.C. managers
Scottish Football League managers
Annbank United F.C. players
Association football forwards